Winiary Nestlé Polska S.A. Oddział w Kaliszu, known more commonly as Winiary, is a Polish food processing company based in the Kalisz borough (to 1976 village) Winiary.

The company was founded by the initiative of a German of Polish descent. The headquarters of the company became one of two unused brewery buildings in Winiary. The first owner of the company was Alfred Nowacki.

Currently, the company is part of the Nestlé corporation, specialising in convenience food as well as quick to prepare food (mostly pulverised) Instant ready-cooked meals, sauces, soups (mostly instant noodles), jelly, kissel and blancmange. Winiary also produces sets of seasoning, which are pulverised and in liquid form (from concentrate).

During 2002–2003, Winiary received various awards for its Majonez Dekoracyjny (Decoration Mayonnaise) product.

In 1998, the image of the company was affected by sanitary epidemiological reconnaissance, which discovered the bacteria salmonella in Winiary's pulverised soups. The company later admitted that the cause of the salmonella bacteria was from imported dried onions. Although the products did not cause any health concerns (the pulverised soups require boiling, in which the bacteria die during the heat treating), confirmed by the sanitary epidemiological reconnaissance, the situation caused negative public opinions and publicity in the media.

References

Food and drink companies of Poland
Polish brands
Condiment companies